Boggyoceras is an extinct genus of nautiloids that lived during the Carboniferous. It contains one valid species, B. centrale. Its fossils have been found in the Boggy Formation of Oklahoma.

References

Prehistoric nautiloid genera